George Austen may refer to:

George Austen (cleric) (1731–1805), Church of England clergyman and the father of Jane Austen
George Austen (MP) (c. 1548–1621), MP for Guildford and Haslemere

See also
George Austin (gardener) (died 1789), gardener
George Austin (priest) (1931–2019), British Anglican priest, broadcaster and author